Arkadiusz Rafał Sowa (born March 2, 1979) is a Polish marathon runner. He set a personal best time of 2:12:00, by finishing seventh at the 2007 Berlin Marathon.

Sowa represented Poland at the 2008 Summer Olympics in Beijing, where he competed for the men's marathon, along with his compatriot Henryk Szost. He successfully finished the race in fifty-fourth place by fifteen seconds ahead of Tanzania's Samson Ramadhani, with a time of 2:24:48.

References

External links

NBC Olympics Profile

Polish male marathon runners
Living people
Olympic athletes of Poland
Athletes (track and field) at the 2008 Summer Olympics
People from Sosnowiec
1979 births
Sportspeople from Silesian Voivodeship